The Monastic Family of Bethlehem, of the Assumption of the Virgin and of Saint Bruno – or simply known as Monastic Brothers of Bethlehem and Monastic Sisters of Bethlehem – is a Roman Catholic institute of consecrated life that practices the Carthusian spirituality and was founded through the inspiration of a small group of French pilgrims on November 1, 1950, at St. Peter's Square, in the Vatican City, following the promulgation of the dogma of the Assumption of the Blessed Virgin Mary into Heaven. The Monastic Sisters were founded in France, soon after, and the Monastic Brothers in 1976.

Charism 

The charism of the Monastic Family of Bethlehem, of the Assumption of the Virgin and of Saint Bruno communities consists in listening to the Gospel with the Blessed Virgin Mary in the heart of the Catholic Church, in love, in solitude, through liturgical life, study, work and poverty. In order to fulfil this vocation more perfectly, the Monasteries of Bethlehem receive Saint Bruno's fatherhood and his wisdom of life.

Controversies  
Since 2015, the monastic family of Bethlehem is the object of a canonical visit led by Fr. Jean Quris, former Deputy Secretary General of the Bishops' Conference of France and by Sister Geneviève Barrière, Benedictine and former abbess of Jouarre, from 2007 to 2014. This visit follows the "dysfunctions" of certain communities and a lack of distinction between the internal and external fora.

A New Prioress General 

Sister Emmanuel was named general prioress of the monastic Family of Bethlehem, of the Assumption of the Virgin and of Saint Bruno by the Congregation of Religious, succeeding Sister Isabelle.
The Congregation of Religious accepted the resignation of Sister Isabelle, former general prioress, “thanking her for the years of service when she succeeded the founder, Sister Marie, and for her courageous and timely decision to hand over her responsibility in this new stage for her monastic Family.”

The Dicastery named a new general prioress, Sister Emmanuel, helped by 5 sisters who are her advisers, and two visitors as apostolic assistants: Father Jean Quris, a priest in the diocese of Angers and an episcopal delegate for consecrated life, and Mother Geneviève Barrière, former Abbess of Jouarre (see above : "controversies"). The role of the assistants chosen by Rome consists in remaining close to the general prioress and to the permanent advisers in order to cooperate in the implementation of the recommendations given by the Dicastery and of the renewal of the Constitutions, in view of a future general chapter to vote on the constitutions and to elect a general prioress.

Presence in the World 

The first community of Monastic Sisters of Bethlehem began in 1951. The first community of Monastic Brothers of Bethlehem (or Monks) was founded in 1976, in the Chartreuse Mountains. The Monastic Family of Bethlehem, of the Assumption of the Virgin and of Saint Bruno has presently more than 670 members: more than 600 nuns and about 70 monks. They live in 30 nunneries and 4 monasteries of brothers located in 15 different nations. The Monastic Family of Bethlehem also contains Lay Associates, Companions and Friends, all of whom contribute to the life of order.

The monasteries of the Monastic Brothers of Bethlehem 
 1976  – Monastère de l’Assomption Notre-Dame – Currière-en-Chartreuse, Saint-Pierre-de-Chartreuse (Diocese of Grenoble-Vienne)The 
 1989  – Monastero dell'Assunta Incoronata – Monte Corona, Umbertide (Archdiocese of Perugia-Città della Pieve)
 1999  – Monastère de Notre-Dame de Maranatha – Beit Shemesh (Latin Patriarch of Jerusalem)

 2005  – Monastère de Lavra Netofa – Lavra Netofa, Deir Hanna (Latin Patriarch of Jerusalem)

The monasteries of the Monastic Sisters of Bethlehem 
 1967  – Monastère de Notre-Dame de la Gloire-Dieu – Les Montvoirons, Boëge (Diocese of Annecy)
 1968  – Monastère de Notre-Dame de la Présence de Dieu, Paris (Archdiocese of Paris)
 1970  – Monastère de Notre-Dame de Bethléem - Poligny, Seine-et-Marne (Diocese of Meaux)
 1971  – Monastère de Notre-Dame de l’Unité – Pugny (Diocese of Chambéry)
 1974  – Monastère de Notre-Dame du Buisson Ardent – Currier-en-Chartreuse, Saint-Laurent-du-Pont (Diocese of Grenoble-Vienne)
 1977  – Monastère de Notre-Dame de Pitié – Mougères, Caux, Hérault (Archdiocese of Montpellier)
 1978  – Monastère de Notre-Dame du Torrent de Vie – Le Thoronet (Diocese of Fréjus-Toulon)
 1981  – Monastero della Madonna del Deserto – Monte Camporeggiano, Gubbio (Diocese of Gubbio)
 1982  – Monastère de Notre-Dame d’Adoration – Le Val Saint Benoît, Épinac (Diocese of Autun)
 1982  – Monastère de Notre-Dame de Clémence – La Verne, Collobrières (Diocese of Fréjus-Toulon)
 1985  – Monastère de Notre-Dame de l’Assomption – The Mother House, Beit Shemesh  (Latin Patriarch of Jerusalem)
 1985  – Kloster Maria im Paradies – Kinderalm, Sankt Veit im Pongau (Archdiocese of Salzburg)
 1985  – Monasterio de Santa María Reina – Villanueva de Sigena (Diocese of Barbastro-Monzòn)
 1987  – Monastery of Bethlehem – Our Lady of Lourdes – Camp Road, Livingston Manor, Sullivan County, New York (Archdiocese of New York)
 1988  – Monastère de l’Assunta Gloriosa – Sari (Diocese of Ajaccio)
 1991  – Monastère de Notre-Dame du Saint Désert en Chartreuse, Saint-Laurent-du-Pont (Diocese of Grenoble-Vienne)
 1991  – Kloster Marienheide - Wollstein (Diocese of Fulda)
 1992  – Monasterio de Santa María en la Santisima Trinidad - Merlo (Diocese of San Luis)
 1993  – Monastère de Sainte Marie Reine des coeurs - Chertsey, Quebec (Diocese of Joliette)
 1994  – Monastère de Notre-Dame de l’Aurore - Paparčiai, Kaišiadorys District Municipality (Diocese of Kaišiadorys)
 1998  – Monaster Najświętszej Dziewicy na Pustyni - Szemud (Archdiocese of Gdańsk)
 1998  – Monastère du Désert de l’Immaculée - Saint-Pé-de-Bigorre (Diocese of Tarbes-et-Lourdes)
 1999  – Monastère de Notre-Dame du Fiat - Zutendaal (Diocese of Hasselt)
 1999  – Monasterio de Santa María del Paraiso – Casilla (Diocese of Valparaíso)
 2002  – Monasterio de la Cartuja Nuestra Senora de la Defension – Jerez de la Frontera (Diocese of Cadiz y Ceuta)
 2004  – Monastery of Bethlehem, of the Assumption of the Virgin, and of Saint Bruno - Paphos (Latin Patriarch of Jerusalem) 
 2006  – Monastère de Lavra Netofa – Lavra Netofa, Deir Hanna (Latin Patriarch of Jerusalem)

 2009  – Sanctuaire Notre-Dame de Palestine – Beit Shemesh (Latin Patriarch of Jerusalem)
 2011  – Monasterio de las Monjas de Belén – Los Hornos, Valle de Vázquez, Tlaquiltenango (Diocese of Cuernavaca)
 2013  – Mosteiro de Nossa Senhora do Rosário – Couço, Coruche (Archdiocese of Evora)

See also 
 Enclosed religious orders
 Order of Carthusians

References

External links 

 Monastic Brothers and Sisters of Bethlehem – Official Website
 Monastery of Our Lady of the Rosary – Portugal
 Monastery arts from the Monks and Sisters of Bethlehem
 Monastery in Livingston Manor, NY (USA)

 Catholic religious orders established in the 20th century